Yazlık is a village in the Adıyaman District, Adıyaman Province, Turkey. The village is populated by Kurds of the Kerdizan tribe and had a population of 141 in 2021.

The hamlets of Kamışlı, Kışla and Koruluk are attached to the village.

References

Villages in Adıyaman District
Kurdish settlements in Adıyaman Province